Heidi M. Pasichow (born May 24, 1955) is an associate judge of the Superior Court of the District of Columbia.

Education and career 
Pasichow earned her Bachelor of Arts from George Washington University in 1977, and her Juris Doctor from Washington College of Law in 1981.

After graduating, she clerked for Judge Sylvia Bacon of the D.C. Superior Court from 1983 to 1985.

D.C. Superior Court 
On December 5, 2006, President George W. Bush nominated her to be an associate judge of the Superior Court of the District of Columbia. Her nomination expired on December 9, 2006, with the end of the 109th United States Congress.

President Bush renominated her on January 9, 2007, to a 15-year term as an associate judge on the Superior Court of the District of Columbia to the seat vacated by Anna Blackburne-Rigsby. On July 23, 2008, the Senate Committee on Homeland Security and Governmental Affairs held a hearing on her nomination. On July 30, 2008, the committee reported her nomination favorably to the senate floor. On August 1, 2008, the full Senate confirmed her nomination by voice vote. She was sworn in on August 25, 2008.

References

1955 births
Living people
George Washington University alumni
Washington College of Law alumni
People from Queens, New York
Judges of the Superior Court of the District of Columbia
21st-century American judges
21st-century American women judges